Eugoa africana is a moth of the  family Erebidae. It is found in South Africa.

References

External links
 
 Natural History Museum Lepidoptera generic names catalog

Endemic moths of South Africa
africana
Moths described in 1900